Universities in Brazil are ranked in a number of ways, including both national and international ranks.

National Rankings

Ranking Universitário Folha
Brazil's largest newspaper Folha de S. Paulo organizes, since 2012, a national ranking of universities with criteria akin to those used by the better known worldwide rankings: research, teaching, internationalization, innovation and market value.

* tied.

Brazilian government evaluation

Higher education evaluations are also conducted by the Brazilian Government; specifically by Inep (Instituto Nacional de Estudos e
Pesquisas Educacionais; English: National Institute of Studies and Research). The Government uses a General Index of Courses (Portuguese: Índice Geral de Cursos; IGC) to determinate the quality of Brazilian's higher education (graduate and post-graduate courses) in Brazil. It's important to add that Universidade de São Paulo, one of the most prestigious universities in the country, has been participating in the IGC since 2013 as part of a technical cooperation with Inep that will last three years, during which time the results concerning the university's courses will not be disclosed. Only then will the university decide whether to fully participate in the government evaluation.

2012 Índice Geral de Cursos

World rankings

2019 Academic Ranking of World Universities

2020 QS World University Rankings

2020 Times Higher Education World University Rankings

See also
Universities and higher education in Brazil
College and university rankings

References

External links
 Ranking Universitário Folha (RUF) - 2019
 Inep
 ICG information

R
University and college rankings